Shanghai: True Valor, known in Japan as , is a tile-matching video game developed and published by Sunsoft and Activision for arcade games and PlayStation in 1998–1999. It is part of the Shanghai series.

Reception

The PlayStation version received average reviews. In Japan, Famitsu gave it a score of 23 out of 40.

References

External links
 
 

1998 video games
Activision games
Arcade video games
Mahjong video games
PlayStation (console) games
Sunsoft games
Tile-matching video games
Video games developed in Japan